The belt buckle pistol was an experimental German World War II firearm consisting of four 7.65 mm or .22 Short barrels and lockwork concealed within a SS belt buckle.  The barrels were 2" long and Smoothbore.  A lever was pressed which allowed the spring-loaded buckle to pivot downwards, exposing the barrel.

Noted firearms authority S.P. Fjestad claims that they were designed by Louis Marquis while he was in a prisoner of war camp during World War I and that fewer than ten of these guns have been discovered.

Use In Nazi Germany 
The specialized pistols were used near the demise of Nazi Germany. Only 15 were ever produced for SS officers who guarded Hitler.

See also 
 TKB-506

References 
References

Bibliography

Further reading

External links
 Alabama Governor pistol collection 
 

Pistols
World War II weapons of Germany
.22 LR pistols
Trial and research firearms of Germany